= Balance of contract =

“Balance of contract” is a term used in the retail industry. Retailers enter into agreements with suppliers to deliver a set quantity of products to a specified location within a given time frame at an agreed price. The retailer may request (“call off”) production in line with projected or actual sales patterns, depending on the product’s stage in its life cycle. At any point, the “balance of contract” refers to the portion of the order that has not yet been delivered but remains contractually committed.

A “balanced contract” between two parties is one in which both share equal rights and obligations throughout its execution. By contrast, an “unbalanced contract” grants one party greater flexibility while restricting the other, and such contracts may be invalidated by a court of law.
